Alfred Charles Crowle (surname rhymes with roll like Kroll) (30 November 1889 – 27 August 1979) was a Mexican Technical Director to Selección de fútbol de México (Mexico national football team). Born in Mexico, he was the son of tin miner Alfred Crowle (born in St. Blazey Gate, Cornwall) and Eugenia Augusta Leonora Shaw.

In 1935 he led Mexico to their first international competition trophy win, the football tournament at the Central American and Caribbean Games tournament.

Cornish miners bringing football to Mexico
In 1900, the then President of Mexico, Gen. Porfirio Díaz, awarded mining concessions to British mining companies. Cornish miners working in the mines of Pachuca and Real Del Monte practised football as a pastime and later went on to form the Real del Monte Pachuca Athletic Club, historically considered the first organized team on Mexican soil, then came the Reformation Athletic Club, the British Club, and the Mexico Cricket Club, among others.

The other main drivers of this sport were Mr. Percy Clifford and Mr. Robert J. Blackmoore who, together with Crowle, brought the rules of the game and the first regulated matches to Mexico. From 1917 to 1920, C. F. Pachuca was champion of the newly formed league, under Crowle.

References

Mexican football managers
Mexico national football team managers
Mexican people of Cornish descent
1889 births
1979 deaths
C.F. Pachuca managers